Cathedral of Saints Peter and Paul in Lubumbashi or simply Lubumbashi Cathedral , in the city of Lubumbashi, Haut-Katanga Province in the Democratic Republic of the Congo, is a parish of the Roman Catholic Church and the seat of the Metropolitan Archdiocese of Lubumbashi (Archidioecesis Lubumbashiensis). The cathedral church is located between Kapenda and Kasa-Vubu avenues. The Convent of St. Peter and St. Paul and several provincial government buildings are located nearby.

The Romanesque Revival church dates to 1920, when the area was under Belgian colonial rule. It was elevated to cathedral status with the promotion of the  Apostolic Vicariate of Katanga to diocesan status in 1959, by the Bull "Cum parvulum" of Pope John XXIII. It is under the pastoral responsibility of the Bishop Jean-Pierre Tafunga.

See also
Catholic Church in the Democratic Republic of the Congo

References

Roman Catholic cathedrals in the Democratic Republic of the Congo
Buildings and structures in Lubumbashi
Roman Catholic churches completed in 1920
Christian organizations established in 1920
20th-century Roman Catholic church buildings in the Democratic Republic of the Congo